The Western Institute of Nanoelectronics WIN is a research institute founded in 2006 and has its headquarters at the UCLA Henry Samueli School of Engineering and Applied Science in Los Angeles, California, US.  The WIN Center networks multiple universities with the Industry and government based sponsors (members of the Semiconductor Industry Association consortium NRI) and the National Institute of Standards and Technology (NIST) in pursuit of replacing Complementary Metal-Oxide Semiconductor Field-Effect Transistors (CMOS FET). WIN's research is focused on spintronics extending from materials, devices, and device interactions, metrology and circuits/architectures. Sponsors include:
Nanoelectronics Research Initiative (NRI)
UC Discovery
NIST
Intel Corporation

WIN is one of four research centers within the Nanoelectronics Research Initiative. Dr. Kang L. Wang serves as Director of the Center. Current WIN university participants include four University of California campuses (Los Angeles, Berkeley, Santa Barbara and Irvine) and Stanford University, Denver University, Portland State University, and University of Iowa.

NRI's goal is to develop a radical, yet practical, new device that continues scaling of semiconductors beyond the predominantly silicon content found in chips that power today's computers and electronics. The aim is to demonstrate feasibility of such devices in simple circuits during the next 5–10 years. NRI is a research initiative of the Nanoelectronics Research Corporation (NERC). And NERC in turn is a subsidiary of the Semiconductor Research Corporation.

References

External links
Western Institute of Nanoelectronics website
WIN at SRC

Nanoelectronics
2006 establishments in California
University of California, Los Angeles